Marc Calixte (born September 26, 1978, in Montreal, Quebec) is a former Canadian football linebacker for the Calgary Stampeders of the Canadian Football League. He was drafted with the seventh overall pick in the 2003 CFL Draft by the Stampeders. He played college football at Tennessee-Martin. Before going to Tennessee-Martin, Marc was a defensive-back at Vanier College. Marc is of Haitian descent.

References

External links
Calgary Stampeders bio

1978 births
Living people
Black Canadian players of Canadian football
Calgary Stampeders players
Canadian football linebackers
Canadian football people from Montreal
Players of Canadian football from Quebec
Canadian sportspeople of Haitian descent
Haitian Quebecers
Canadian players of American football
UT Martin Skyhawks football players